Etretat Churchyard is a war grave in Étretat, Normandy, France, maintained by the Commonwealth War Graves Commission. It was originally the civil graveyard of Église Notre-Dame (the Church of Our Lady) in that town.

Etretat Churchyard itself contains 264 Commonwealth and one German burial from the First World War. Etretat Churchyard Extension contains 282 First World War burials and four from the Second World War. The extension also includes 12 German graves.

Notable interments 

 Leo Clarke VC (1892–1916), Canadian soldier
 Clarrie Wallach MC (1889–1918), Australian international rugby union player, and soldier
 Arthur Smith MM and bar
 Wilfred Harold Ramsden MM DCM
 Albert Edward Barber MM
 William John Curtis MM
 Frederick Henry Mann MM
 Benjamin King Barnes DCM
 Thomas Bleackley DCM
 T. W. Creed DCM
 L. A. Walford DCM
 Leo Genn  CdG (France)

See also
 :nl:Etretat Churchyard Extension

References

External links
 
 

Commonwealth War Graves Commission cemeteries in France
Cemeteries in Normandy
World War I cemeteries in France
World War II cemeteries in France